Junonia natalica, the Natal pansy or brown pansy, is a butterfly of the family Nymphalidae. It is found in the Afrotropical realm.

The wingspan is 45–50 mm in males and 48–55 mm in females.

The larvae feed on Asystasia gangetica and Phaulopsis imbricata.

Subspecies
Junonia natalica natalica (eastern and central Kenya, Tanzania, Pemba Island, Malawi, Zambia, Mozambique, Zimbabwe, northern Botswana, Namibia: Caprivi, Eswatini, South Africa: Limpopo, Mpumalanga, KwaZulu-Natal, Eastern Cape)
Junonia natalica angolensis (Rothschild, 1918) (Angola, south-eastern Democratic Republic of the Congo, Burundi)

References

natal
Butterflies of Africa
Butterflies described in 1860
Taxa named by Baron Cajetan von Felder
Taxa named by Rudolf Felder